Bijan Nobaveh-Vatan is an Iranian former anchorman and conservative politician who represented Tehran, Rey, Shemiranat and Eslamshahr electoral district in the Parliament of Iran from 2008 to 2016.

He served as the United Nations and New York bureau chief for Islamic Republic of Iran Broadcasting before taking seat in the Parliament.

References 

1959 births
Living people
Iranian journalists
Members of the 8th Islamic Consultative Assembly
Members of the 9th Islamic Consultative Assembly
Deputies of Tehran, Rey, Shemiranat and Eslamshahr
Front of Islamic Revolution Stability politicians
Coalition of the Pleasant Scent of Servitude politicians
Popular Front of Islamic Revolution Forces politicians
People from Tehran